"Ti vorrei sollevare" is a song written,  recorded by Italian Pop rock singer Elisa and produced by her and Andrea "Ringuz" Rigonat, featuring Italian singer Giuliano Sangiorgi from Negramaro. It was released as the lead single for Elisa's sixth studio album, Heart.

Release
The track was released on the radio and digitally in Italy on 16 October 2009 and it reached the #1 on the Italian Chart FIMI for the first two weeks from its release, on Italian Airplay Chart since 15 November 2009 and was certified Platinum Award for the copies sold.

Music video
The music video for "Ti vorrei sollevare" was directed by the Italian film director Marco Ponti and was produced by One More. It premiered on the Corriere della Sera website on 5 November 2009 and was set in a Mountain's countryside.

Chart performance

Year-end charts

Certifications

Credits
Elisa – vocals, keyboards, programming
Giuliano Sangiorgi – vocals
Andrea Fontana – drums
Max Gelsi – bass
Gianluca Ballarin – keyboards
Andrea Rigonat – electric guitar and acoustic guitar, programming
Simone Bertolotti – effects

References

2009 singles
Elisa (Italian singer) songs
Italian-language songs
Number-one singles in Italy
Songs written by Elisa (Italian singer)
Rock ballads
2009 songs
Sugar Music singles